Hammann may refer to
Charles Hammann, American aviator
Gregg Hammann, corporate executive
 Johann Wolfgang Hammann, founder of the Wallendorf porcelain manufacture in Lichte Thuringia
Nicolas Hammann, American professor race car driver
Niel Hammann, South African journalist and magazine editor
Otto Hammann, German journalist
Wilhelm Hammann, survivor of Buchenwald concentration camp
USS Hammann, several warships of the U.S. Navy